Tourism in Chicago draws on the city's  status as a "world-class destination known for its impressive architecture, first-rate museums, brilliant chefs" and wide variety of neighborhood attractions.

In 2017, Millennium Park saw 25 million  visitors, making it  the top tourist destination in  the Midwest and  among the top ten in the United States.

Visitor statistics
Chicago tourism   recorded  55 million visitors in 2017. 
In 2016, Chicago saw 54.1 million visitors; a 2.9% increase from 2015. In 2015, it was estimated that 50.1 million visitors came to Chicago, which was a 4.5 percent increase from 2014. From 2010 through 2014, the tourism and hospitality industries have added 9,800 jobs, generating $13.7 billion in direct spending by visitors and $871 million in total tax revenue.
Tourism in Chicago was disrupted by the COVID-19 pandemic.

Market overview
Major conventions are held at McCormick Place. The historic Chicago Cultural Center (1897) serves as the city's Visitor Information Center. Tourists will find sites of interest in Grant Park which contains Millennium Park, Buckingham Fountain (1927), and the Art Institute of Chicago. Millennium Park's Cloud Gate sculpture and fountain's two towers incorporate LED facial images. Events such as the Grant Park Music Festival take place in the city. Chicago performing arts venues include the Harris Theater for Music and Dance and the Chicago Opera Theater.

Navy Pier, east of Streeterville, contains retail, restaurants, museums, exhibition halls and auditoriums. Its 15 story Ferris wheel is among the most visited landmarks with about 8 million visitors each year.

The city's Museum Campus, holds: the Adler Planetarium & Astronomy Museum, the Field Museum of Natural History, and the Shedd Aquarium. The Museum Campus accesses the Art Institute of Chicago in Grant Park.  The Museum of Science and Industry is also a leading attraction.

About one-third of Chicago's tourists enjoy the city's entertainment venues including McCormick Place and the Chicago Theatre.

Choose Chicago 

Choose Chicago is the official tourism organization for the city. In January 2012, Mayor Emanuel launched Chicago's new tourism organization, Choose Chicago. The Mayor's vision was to restructure all tourism sales and marketing activities under a single, streamlined agency, and outline clear and measurable objectives to track these efforts. Choose Chicago partners with the Metropolitan Pier and Exposition Authority, the Chicago Office of Tourism, the City of Chicago, and the Illinois Department of Commerce and Economic Opportunity's Bureau of Tourism, as well as many other related associations in Chicago. It handles convention sales for McCormick Place and Navy Pier.
 
The former Chicago Convention and Tourism Bureau was founded in 1970 with the merger of the Chicago Convention and Visitors Bureau and the Tourism Council of Greater Chicago.  The Chicago North Shore Convention and Visitor's Bureau serves Evanston, Glenview, Northbrook and Skokie. The offices of the CNSCVB are located in downtown Skokie, Illinois. The Chicago Southland Convention & Visitors Bureau serves the 62 south and southwest suburbs of Chicago. Their office is in Lansing, Illinois.

Attractions

Architecture of Chicago
Beaches in Chicago
List of Chicago Landmarks
List of museums and cultural institutions in Chicago
McCormick Tribune Plaza & Ice Rink
Parks in Chicago
Sports in Chicago
Theatre in Chicago

Shopping
Magnificent Mile
State Street

Gallery

References

External links

 Choose Chicago official Chicago Tourism website
 Chicago's North Shore Convention & Visitors Bureau
 Tourism Chicago